The qualification for the 2012 Men's Olympic Volleyball Tournament was held from 13 August 2011 to 10 June 2012.

Qualification summary

* The Asian Qualifier was combined with the 1st World Qualifier. The first place team of the tournament qualified as the 1st World Qualifier winners, while the best Asian team except the 1st World Qualifier winners qualified as the Asian Qualifier winners.

Means of qualification

Host country
FIVB reserved a vacancy for the 2012 Summer Olympics host country to participate in the tournament.

2011 World Cup

Venues: 
Dates: 20 November – 4 December 2011
The top three teams qualified for the 2012 Summer Olympics.

Continental qualification tournaments

Africa
Venue:  Palais des Sports de Warda, Yaoundé, Cameroon
Dates: 17–21 January 2012
All times are West Africa Time (UTC+01:00).
The winners qualified for the 2012 Summer Olympics.

|}

|}

Asia and Oceania
The 2012 Asian Olympic Qualification Tournament combined with 2012 1st World Olympic Qualification Tournament. The hosts Japan and the top four ranked teams except Japan from the 2011 Asian Championship competed in the tournament. The top ranked among the five teams except the 2012 1st World Olympic Qualification Tournament winners qualified for the 2012 Summer Olympics as the 2012 Asian Olympic Qualification Tournament winners.

Europe

Venue:  Armeets Arena, Sofia, Bulgaria
Dates: 8–13 May 2012
The winners qualified for the 2012 Summer Olympics.

North America

Venue:  Walter Pyramid, Long Beach, United States
Dates: 7–12 May 2012
The winners qualified for the 2012 Summer Olympics.

South America
Venue:  Polideportivo Almirante Brown, Burzaco, Argentina
Dates: 11–13 May 2012
All times are Argentina Time (UTC−03:00).
The winners qualified for the 2012 Summer Olympics.

|}

|}

World qualification tournaments
Qualified teams
Hosts

 

Qualified through the 2011 Asian Championship.
 *
 *
 *
 *

Qualified through the FIVB World Ranking as of 4 January 2012.
 (as CAVB 1 – No. 11)
 (as CEV 1 – No. 7)
 (as CEV 2 – No. 21)
 (as CEV 3 – No. 23)
 (as NORCECA 1 – No. 5)
 (as NORCECA 2 – No. 17)
 (as CSV 1 – No. 16)

* The top four teams from 2011 Asian Championship were predetermined to be in 1st tournament in Japan.

 – Italy, which were previously announced as hosts of 2nd tournament, won the 2020 European Olympic Qualification Tournament and secured a direct berth.  replaced Italy as hosts.

1st tournament
Venue:  Tokyo Metropolitan Gymnasium, Tokyo, Japan
Dates: 1–10 June 2012
All times are Japan Standard Time (UTC+09:00).
The winners and the best Asian team except the winners qualified for the 2012 Summer Olympics.

|}

|}

2nd tournament
Venue:  Armeets Arena, Sofia, Bulgaria
Dates: 8–10 June 2012
All times are Eastern European Summer Time (UTC+03:00).
The winners qualified for the 2012 Summer Olympics.

|}

|}

3rd tournament
Venue:  Max-Schmeling-Halle, Berlin, Germany
Dates: 8–10 June 2012
All times are Central European Summer Time (UTC+02:00).
The winners qualified for the 2012 Summer Olympics.

|}

|}

References

External links
Qualification process
Official website of the 2012 African Olympic Qualification Tournament
Official website of the 2012 European Olympic Qualification Tournament
Official website of the 2012 North American Olympic Qualification Tournament
Official website of the 2012 South American Olympic Qualification Tournament at FEVA.org
Official website of the 2012 1st World Olympic Qualification Tournament
Official website of the 2012 2nd World Olympic Qualification Tournament
Official website of the 2012 3rd World Olympic Qualification Tournament

Olympic Qualification Men
Olympic Qualification Men

2012